Jean–Paul Luksic Fontbona is a Chilean heir and businessman.

Early life
His late father was Andrónico Luksic (1926-2005), founder of Luksic Group, including Antofagasta PLC, Minera Los Pelambres, Minera Michilla, and Minera El Tesoro. He is an heir to the wealthiest family in Chile. He received a Bachelor of Science in Management and Science from the London School of Economics.

Career
He serves as Chairman of Antofagasta PLC. He also sits on the Board of Directors of Madeco.

Personal life
He married  Belinda Anne Nonie James in 1993. They have three children: Isabella Joan Mary Luksic (born 1994), Thomas Luksic (born 1997), and Sebastian Luksic (born 1998).

References

Living people
Year of birth missing (living people)
Alumni of the London School of Economics
Chilean businesspeople
Chilean people of Croatian descent